William Shanks (25 January 1812 – June 1882) was an English amateur mathematician. The error was discovered in 1944 by D. F. Ferguson (using a mechanical desk calculator). Nevertheless, Shanks's approximation was the longest expansion of  until the advent of the digital electronic computer in the 1940s.

Biography 
Shanks was born in 1812 in Corsenside. He may have been a student of William Rutherford as a young boy in the 1820s, and he dedicated a book on  published in 1853 to Rutherford. After his marriage in 1846, Shanks earned his living by owning a boarding school at Houghton-le-Spring, which left him enough time to spend on his hobby of calculating mathematical constants.

In addition to calculating , Shanks also calculated e and the Euler–Mascheroni constant γ to many decimal places. He published a table of primes (and the periods of their reciprocals) up to 110,000 and found the natural logarithms of 2, 3, 5 and 10 to 137 places. During his calculations, which took many tedious days of work, Shanks was said to have calculated new digits all morning and would then spend all afternoon checking his morning's work.

Shanks died in Houghton-le-Spring, County Durham, England in June 1882, aged 70, and was buried at the local Hillside Cemetery on 17 June 1882.

Calculations of pi 

To calculate , Shanks used Machin's formula:
 

Shanks calculated  to 530 decimal places in January 1853, of which the first 527 were correct (the last few likely being incorrect because of round-off errors). He subsequently expanded his calculation to 607 decimal places in April 1853, but an error introduced at the start of the new calculation, right at the 530th decimal place where his previous calculation ended, rendered the rest of his calculation erroneous. Given the nature of Machin's formula, the error propagated back to the 528th decimal place, leaving only the first 527 digits correct once again. In April 1873, twenty years later, Shanks expanded his calculation to 707 decimal places. Because this was an expansion of his previous calculation, all of the new digits were incorrect as well.

The approximation in the image reads as follows:

See also
Chronology of computation of π
History of π

References

External links
 Shanks's biography at the University of St Andrews
 Article about Shanks in Houghton-le-Spring
 Matt Parker explains the William Shanks method.

1812 births
1882 deaths
19th-century English mathematicians
Pi-related people
Amateur mathematicians
People from Houghton-le-Spring